Wisconsin has the twenty-first highest income among states in the United States of America, with a per capita income of $26,624 (2010). See also List of U.S. states by income.

Wisconsin counties ranked by per capita income

Note: Data are from the 2010 United States Census and the 2006-2010 American Community Survey 5-Year Estimates.

References

United States locations by per capita income
Economy of Wisconsin
Income